A list of science fiction films released in the 1970s. These 235 films include core elements of science fiction, but can cross into other genres. They have been released to a cinema audience by the commercial film industry and are widely distributed with reviews by reputable critics.

During the 1970s, blockbuster science fiction films, which reached a much larger audience than previously, began to make their appearance. The financial success of these films resulted in heavy investment in special effects by the American film industry, leading to big-budget, heavily marketed science fiction film releases during the 1990s. Collectively, the science fiction films from the 1970s received 11 Academy Awards, 10 Saturn Awards, six Hugo Awards, three Nebula Awards and two Grammy Awards. Two of these films, Star Wars (1977, currently known as Star Wars Episode IV: A New Hope) and Superman (1978), were the highest-grossing films of their respective years of release.

List

See also
 History of science fiction films

Notes

References

1970s
Lists of 1970s films by genre